Yamelin Ramírez Cota is a Mexican model and beauty pageant titleholder who won the title of Nuestra Belleza Mundo México at the Nuestra Belleza México 2014 pageant. She represented Mexico in Miss World 2015 pageant.

References

Living people
Mexican beauty pageant winners
Nuestra Belleza México winners
People from Navojoa
Miss World 2015 delegates
Year of birth missing (living people)